In enzymology, an indolepyruvate ferredoxin oxidoreductase is an enzyme that catalyzes the chemical reaction

(indol-3-yl)pyruvate + CoA + oxidized ferredoxin  S-2-(indol-3-yl)acetyl-CoA + CO2 + reduced ferredoxin

The 3 substrates of this enzyme are (indol-3-yl)pyruvate, CoA, and oxidized ferredoxin, whereas its 3 products are S-2-(indol-3-yl)acetyl-CoA, CO2, and reduced ferredoxin.

This enzyme belongs to the family of oxidoreductases, specifically those acting on the aldehyde or oxo group of donor with an iron-sulfur protein as acceptor.  The systematic name of this enzyme class is 3-(indol-3-yl)pyruvate:ferredoxin oxidoreductase (decarboxylating, CoA-indole-acetylating). Other names in common use include 3-(indol-3-yl)pyruvate synthase (ferredoxin), and IOR.

References

 
 
 
 

EC 1.2.7
Enzymes of unknown structure